Mary George may refer to:

 Mary Forrest George (1940–2010), British-Canadian writer under pen name Elizabeth Thornton
 Mary Charles George (1913–2008), Kittitian educator
 M. Dorothy George (1870–1971), British historian